The women's high jump at the 1946 European Athletics Championships was held in Oslo, Norway, at Bislett Stadium on 22 August 1946.

Medalists

Results

Final
22 August

Participation
According to an unofficial count, 10 athletes from 7 countries participated in the event.

 (1)
 (2)
 (2)
 (1)
 (1)
 (1)
 (2)

References

High jump
High jump at the European Athletics Championships
Euro